The Broken Star is a 1956 American Western film directed by Lesley Selander and written by John C. Higgins. The film stars Howard Duff, Lita Baron, Bill Williams, Douglas Fowley, Henry Calvin, Addison Richards, Joel Ashley and John Pickard. The film was released in April 1956, by United Artists.

Plot
A deputy marshall (Smeed) kills a ranch hand and steals a sack of gold. He claims it was a fair fight but the marshal of Arizona's Southern Territory (Forrester) has his doubts. Unknown to Smeed, there was a witness to the murder (Nachez). While the investigation unfolds, Smeed tries to cover up the evidence and eliminate people who can implicate him.

Another deputy (Gentry), who has always admired Smeed, defends him to his girlfriend (Alvarado) but is astonished when Alvarado translates the written eyewitness account (from the Spanish) by Nachez. Smeed kidnaps Nachez, taking him to a mine, where he kills him and hides the body. Gentry shows up at the mine but is over-powered by Smeed, tied up, and left to be buried in a cave-in caused by Smeed setting a charge.

The marshal arrives with his posse and hunts down Smeed inside the mine, using an alternate entry. In the meantime, Gentry, who survives the cave-in, unties himself and joins the hunt. The posse corners Smeed, who draws first, and is killed by Gentry. In the closing scene, Gentry (with his new bride, Alvarado), is presented with a new badge by Forrester and congratulated for being appointed to the position of marshal of Arizona's Northern Territory.

Cast 
Howard Duff as Deputy Marshal Frank Smeed
Lita Baron as Conchita Alvarado
Bill Williams as Deputy Marshal Bill Gentry
Douglas Fowley as Hiram Charleton
Henry Calvin as Thornton Wills
Addison Richards as Marshal Wayne Forrester
Joel Ashley as Messendyke
John Pickard as Van Horn
William 'Bill' Phillips as Doc Mott 
Joe Dominguez as Nachez

References

External links 
 

1956 films
1950s English-language films
United Artists films
American Western (genre) films
1956 Western (genre) films
Films directed by Lesley Selander
Films scored by Paul Dunlap
1950s American films
American black-and-white films